NGC 7052 is an elliptical galaxy in the constellation Vulpecula. The galaxy harbours a supermassive black hole with mass c. 220-630 million solar masses in its nucleus.

References

External links
 

Elliptical galaxies
Vulpecula
7052
11718
66537